DTU Roadrunners is a student driven project at the Technical University of Denmark competing in the Shell Eco-marathon races. The team participates in one or both of the two classes at Shell Eco-Marathon Europe: the UrbanConcept class and the Prototype class with the cars Dynamo and Innovator respectively. The team consists of 20 to 30 students. Project work in the course is based on the CDIO-working form and students are thus responsible for the development, construction and operation of the vehicles.

UrbanConcept 
The UrbanConcept category in the Shell Eco-Marathon has the aim to create a very fuel-efficient car that looks similar to a small city car.

Results

Autonomous UrbanConcept 
The Autonomous UrbanConcept challenge was launched in 2018 with multiple challenges for self-driving vehicles. DTU Dynamo became the first student-built car to complete a lap on the Shell Eco-Marathon track fully autonomously.

Results

Prototype

Results

References

External links 
 https://ecocar.mek.dtu.dk/
 https://www.shell.com/energy-and-innovation/shell-ecomarathon/europe.html

Shell Eco-marathon challengers
Sustainable transport
Concept cars
Vehicle technology
Ethanol fuel
Technical University of Denmark